The dredge valve is a component of a Cutter Suction Dredge or a Trailing Suction Hopper Dredger that is used control the flow of water and sand in the suction and discharge pipes of one of these types of dredgers.
There are 3 cases when this vertical valve can block or reduce the mixture flow of water and sand by lowering its gate: 
                                                                                                                                                                               
 1.from the hopper of the TSHD to the discharge pipe.
 2.from the dredge cutter head of the CSD to the ship
 3.from the dredge drag head of the TSHD to the ship

The dredge valve’s gate is hydraulically control and it has raised a lot of challenges because of maintaining it clean. The gate can be blocked by the sand that enter thorough the dredge valve causing a lot of damages. Because of this reason the dredge valve has a lot of water flushing canals in order to keep it clean.

See also
Gate valve

Dredgers